Wop is a pejorative slur for Italians or people of Italian descent.

Etymology
The Merriam-Webster dictionary states wop's first known use was in the United States in 1908, and that it originates from the Southern Italian dialectal term guappo, roughly meaning "dandy", or "swaggerer", derived from the Spanish term guapo, meaning "good-looking", "dandy", from Latin vappa for "sour wine", also "worthless fellow". 

In Neapolitan and other Southern Italo-Romance varieties, guappo is pronounced roughly as wahp-po. As word-final vowels in Southern Italian varieties are often realised as /ə/, guappo would often sound closer to wahpp to anglophones. Guappo historically refers to a type of flashy, boisterous, swaggering, dandy-like criminal in the Naples area. The word eventually became associated with members of the Camorra and has often been used in the Naples area as a friendly or humorous term of address among men. The word likely transformed into the slur "wop" following the arrival of poor Italian immigrants into the United States. Southern Italian immigrant males would often refer to one another as guappo in a jocular or playful manner; as these Italian immigrants often worked as manual laborers in the United States, their native-born American employers and fellow laborers took notice of the Italians' playful term of address and eventually began deploying it as a derogatory term for all Italians and Southern Europeans, along with the term Dago. The term guappo was especially used by older Italian immigrant males to refer to the younger Italian male immigrants arriving in America.

False etymologies
One false etymology or backronym of wop is that it is an acronym for "without passport" or "without papers", implying that Italian immigrants entered the U.S. as undocumented or illegal immigrants. The term has nothing to do with immigration documents, as these were not required by U.S. immigration officers until 1924, after the slur had already come into use in the United States. 

Another backronym is that wop stands for "working on pavement," based on a stereotype that Italian immigrants and Italian-American men typically do manual labor such as road building. Turning acronyms into words did not become common practice until after World War II, accelerating along with the growth of the US space program and the Cold War. The first use of wop significantly predates that period.

See also

List of ethnic slurs
Anti-Italianism
Dago (slur)
Guido (slang)
Goombah
Wog

References

External links

Pejorative terms for European people
Anti-Italian sentiment
American slang
English words